Jera may be:
Jere language (as in Ethnologue 13)
Jara language